Highpoint can refer to:
Highpoint, Florida, an unincorporated community near Tampa Bay
Highpoint Shopping Centre in Melbourne, Australia
Highpoint (building), an apartment building in London, United Kingdom.
Highpoint I, a set of 1930s apartment buildings in London, United Kingdom.
Highpointing, the sport of visiting the point with the highest elevation within some area
Highpoint (film), a 1984 American film starring Christopher Plummer
Hi-Point Firearms

See also
Lists of highest points
High Point (disambiguation)
Highpoint Prison (disambiguation)